Major General John Walter Graham Tulloch CB (2 November 1861 – 9 May 1934) was a British soldier and diplomat who served with the Indian Army and other British army forces in Africa and Asia.

Career
Tulloch was first commissioned on 11 August 1880 and was appointed to the Indian Army on 11 October 1882; he had risen to the rank of major in 1900. In 1901, Tulloch led a force of Baluchi (Indian), Australian (naval), and Japanese troops at Kaoli-yung in China. In 1905, he was a military attaché posted to the British legation in Tokyo.  In this period, he was joined by other officers from other parts of the British Empire, including Captain Alexander Bannerman, Captain Berkeley Vincent, Captain Arthur Hart-Synnot. and Captain Herbert Cyril Thacker.

Tulloch was an observer with Japanese forces during the Russo-Japanese War; and his reports were forwarded to London. On 18 October 1907, Tulluch was promoted to the rank of brigadier general. On 1 May 1908 he was promoted to major-general and he retired on the 1 April 1912.

Honors
 Brilliant Star of Zanzibar, 1895-1896.
 Companion of the Order of the Bath

See also
 Military attachés and observers in the Russo-Japanese War

Notes

References
 Addison, Henry Robert; Charles Henry Oakes; William John Lawson; and Douglas Brooke Wheelton Sladen. (1907).  Who's Who, Vol. 59. London: A&C Black. OCLC 1162806
 Burke, John and Bernard Burke. (1914).  Burke's genealogical and heraldic history of peerage, baronetage and knightage. London: Burke's Peerage Ltd. OCLC 2790692
 Great Britain War Office, General Staff. (1908).  The Russo-Japanese War: Reports from British Officers Attached to the Japanese and Russian Forces in the Field. London: H.M. Stationery Office.
 Towle, Philip. (1998).  "Aspects of the Russo-Japanese War: British Observers of the Russo-Japanese War,"  Paper No. IS/1998/351. STICERD, LSE.
 Sisemore, James D. (2003).  Sisemore, James D. (2003).  "The Russo-Japanese War, Lessons Not Learned."  U.S. Army Command and General Staff College.

1861 births
People of the Russo-Japanese War
Companions of the Order of the Bath
British Indian Army generals
1934 deaths